The canton of Roanne-Nord is a French former administrative division located in the department of Loire and the Rhone-Alpes region. It was disbanded following the French canton reorganisation which came into effect in March 2015. It had 32,466 inhabitants (2012).

The canton comprised the following communes:
La Bénisson-Dieu
Briennon
Mably
Roanne (partly)

See also
Cantons of the Loire department

References

Former cantons of Loire (department)
2015 disestablishments in France
States and territories disestablished in 2015